Jereh may refer to:

Jereh Group, a Chinese oilfield services company and oilfield equipment manufacturer 
Jereh Rural District, a rural district (dehestan) in Jereh and Baladeh District, Kazerun County, Fars Province, Iran
Jereh (Iranian village), a village of the Jereh Rural District

See also
Jireh (disambiguation)